Antonio Bernieri (died 1456) was a Roman Catholic prelate who served as Bishop of Lodi (1435–1456).

Biography
On 7 June 1435, Antonio Bernieri was appointed during the papacy of Pope Alexander VI as Bishop of Lodi.
He served as Bishop of Lodi until his death on 29 May 1456. 
While bishop, he was the principal consecrator of Jacopo-Antonio dalla Torre, Bishop of Reggio Emilia (1439).

References

External links and additional sources
 (for Chronology of Bishops) 
 (for Chronology of Bishops) 

15th-century Italian Roman Catholic bishops
Bishops appointed by Pope Alexander VI
1456 deaths